Bharella Shah Nuruddin High School is a secondary school located in Bharella, Burichang Upazila of Comilla District, Bangladesh. It was established in 1962 to eradicate illiteracy from the village. Almost 1,500 students study there.

History 
In October 2016, an eighth grade student drank pesticide at home after being beaten with a cane in front of her classmates at the school. She died on the way to Dhaka Medical College Hospital.

See also 
 Education in Bangladesh
 Board of Intermediate and Secondary Education, Comilla
 List of schools in Bangladesh

References 

Schools in Comilla District
High schools in Bangladesh
Educational institutions established in 1962
1962 establishments in East Pakistan